Paramonov is a Russian masculine surname, its feminine counterpart is Paramonova. It may refer to
Aleksandr Paramonov (born 1942), Soviet swimmer
Aleksei Paramonov (1925–2018), Soviet football player and manager
Konstantin Paramonov (born 1973), Russian football coach and former player
Sergey Paramonov (born 1945), Soviet fencer
Sergey Jacques Paramonov (1894–1967) Russian-Australian entomologist
Vadym Paramonov (born 1991), Ukrainian football player

Russian-language surnames